Carbon Glow is an unincorporated community located in Letcher County, Kentucky, United States.

The community was named for the Carbon Glow Coal Co.

References

Unincorporated communities in Letcher County, Kentucky
Unincorporated communities in Kentucky
Coal towns in Kentucky